Spanakos is a Greek surname. Notable people with the surname include:

Nick Spanakos (born 1938), American boxer
Pete Spanakos (born 1938), American boxer, twin brother of Nick

Greek-language surnames